Patrizio Stronati (born 17 November 1994) is a Czech football defender who plays for Puskás Akadémia.

Club career
In January 2015, he moved to Austrian Bundesliga side Austria Wien from Baník Ostrava for an undisclosed fee. Stronati made his debut for Austria Wien in a 5–2 win against Rheindorf Altach on 21 February 2015. He scored in the 86th minute.

International career
In March 2021 he was called up to the senior Czech Republic squad and was on the bench against Wales.

Personal life
Stronati was born in Czech Republic to an Italian father and Czech mother.

References

External links
 
 

1994 births
Czech people of Italian descent
Czech footballers
Czech Republic youth international footballers
Czech Republic under-21 international footballers
Association football defenders
Czech First League players
Austrian Football Bundesliga players
FC Baník Ostrava players
FK Austria Wien players
Living people
FK Mladá Boleslav players
FC Hlučín players
Expatriate footballers in Austria
Czech expatriate sportspeople in Austria
Puskás Akadémia FC players
Nemzeti Bajnokság I players
Czech expatriate sportspeople in Hungary
Expatriate footballers in Hungary